iCrime with Elizabeth Vargas is an American reality television show hosted by Elizabeth Vargas and is produced by Scott Sternberg Productions that premiered in syndication on September 12, 2022.

Synopsis 
The show features clips of real crimes caught on camera, whether phone or not; Vargas interviews the crime victims, bystanders, law-enforcement officials or the amateur videographers themselves; and a panel of true-crime experts. The show explores the phenomenon on how technology helps intersecting with crime in the world.

Ratings 
The show received a Nielsen rating on 0.5/4.

References

External links 

 
 

2022 American television series debuts
2006 American television series debuts
English-language television shows
2020s American reality television series